The 1968–69 OB I bajnokság season was the 32nd season of the OB I bajnokság, the top level of ice hockey in Hungary. Eight teams participated in the league, and Ujpesti Dozsa SC won the championship.

Regular season

External links
 Season on hockeyarchives.info

Hun
OB I bajnoksag seasons
1968–69 in Hungarian ice hockey